is a Japanese voice actor, singer and narrator affiliated with Aoni Production.

He is best known for the voice of Levi Ackerman in Attack on Titan, Trafalgar Law in One Piece, Mephisto Pheles in Blue Exorcist, Izaya Orihara in Durarara!!, Shinji Matō in the Fate franchise, Takashi Natsume in Natsume Yūjin Chō, Choromatsu in Mr. Osomatsu, Akashi Seijuro in Kuroko's Basketball, Yuzuru Otonashi in Angel Beats!, Yato in Noragami, Ranpo Edogawa in Bungo Stray Dogs, Nozomu Itoshiki in Sayonara, Zetsubou-Sensei, Koyomi Araragi in the Monogatari series, Sōma in Working!!, Juli in Brothers Conflict, Balder Hringhorni in Kamigami no Asobi, Tieria Erde in Mobile Suit Gundam 00, Saiki Kusuo in The Disastrous Life of Saiki K. and Kinshirō Kusatsu in Cute High Earth Defense Club LOVE!.

He won "Best Lead Actor" and "Best Personality" at the 3rd Seiyu Awards, and "Best Supporting Actor" at the 2nd Seiyu Awards. He hosts the radio show Dear Girl: Stories with Daisuke Ono.

Personal life
In July 2016, the tabloid magazine Flash revealed Kamiya had been married to manga artist Hikaru Nakamura for an undetermined amount of time. They have a daughter. During the 484th episode of Dear Girl: Stories, Kamiya only confirmed himself to be the person in the photo with the child, but he has never revealed the marriage allegations.

Filmography

Animated series
{| class="wikitable sortable plainrowheaders"
! Year
! Title
! Role
! class="unsortable"| Notes
! class="unsortable"| Source
|-
|rowspan="2"| 1992
| Kiteretsu Daihyakka
| Akihiko Nonoka
| second voice
|
|-
| Tsuyoshi Shikkari Shinasai
| 
|
| 
|-
| 1993
| Aoki Densetsu Shoot!
| 
|
| 
|-
|rowspan="2"| 1994
| Marmalade Boy
| Ginta's Friend
| 
|
|-
| Chibi Maruko-chan
| Hiroshi Takeda
| 
|
|-
|rowspan="2"| 1995
| Captain Tsubasa J
| Hanji Urabe
| 
|
|-
| Magical Girl Pretty Sammy
| Makoto Mizushina
| 
|
|-
|rowspan="3"| 1996
| Dragon Ball GT
| Poberu [Pan's Date]  Ronge 
| 
|
|-
| Slayers Next
| 
| 
|
|-
| Magical Project S
| 
| 
|
|-
| 1997
| Cho Mashin Hero Wataru
| Boy
| 
|
|-
|rowspan="5"| 1998
| Android Ana Maico 2010
| 
| 
|
|-
| DT Eightron
| Ryou/ Karuno
| 
|
|-
| Trigun
| Zazie the Beast
| 
|
|-
| Sorcerous Stabber Orphen
| 
| 
|
|-
| Yu-Gi-Oh!
| Officer
| 
|
|-
| 1998–99
| Master Keaton
| Shinsuke Funase
| 
|
|-
|rowspan="3"| 1999
| Corrector Yui
| Takashi Fuji
| 
|
|-
| Jibaku-kun
| Kai
| 
|
|-
| Super B-Daman
| 
| 
|
|-
|rowspan="6"| 2001
| Super GALS! Kotobuki Ran
| Rei Otohata
| 
|
|-
| The Family's Defensive Alliance
| 
| 
|
|-
| Noir
| Dominic
| 
|
|-
| Beyblade
| Sanguinex
| 
|
|-
| Gundam Evolve
| Hiden
| 
|
|-
| Offside
| Katsuhiko Ibino
| 
|
|-
|rowspan="8"| 2002
| Atashin'chi
| 
| 
|
|-
| Kanon
| Kuze
| 
|
|-
| Digimon Frontier
| Koji Minamoto
| 
|
|-
| Baby Baachan
| Eiki Jinguuji
| 
|
|-
| Mirage of Blaze
| Kojirou Date
| 
|
|-
| Generation of Chaos Next
| Lifile
| 
|
|-
| I'll/CKBC
| Hiiragi Hitonari
| 
|
|-
| Mirmo Zibang
| Takumi Kiryuu
| 
|
|-
| 2002–08
| Saint Seiya Hades: Chapter Inferno
| Lyra Orphee
|
|
|-
| rowspan="8" |2003
| Ultra Maniac
| Tetsushi Kaji
| 
|
|-
|One Piece
|Eddy
|Ep. 146
|
|-
| L/R: Licensed by Royalty
| 
| 
|
|-
| Zatch Bell!
| Eita Kobozuka
| 
|
|-
| Green Green
| Kenichi Hotta
| 
|
|-
| Beyblade G-Revolution
| Garland Siebald
| 
|
|-
| Tank Knights Portriss
| Dua Carry
| 
|
|-
| Pocket Monsters Advanced Generation
| Hiromi
| 
|
|-
| 2003–04
| Mirmo!
| 
|
| 
|-
| 2003
| Sonic X
| member of team S
| 
|
|-
|rowspan="15| 2004
| Agatha Christie's Great Detectives Poirot and Marple
| John
| Ep. 1
|
|-
| Superior Defender Gundam Force
| Captain Gundam
| 
|
|-
| Gantz
| Masanobu Hojou
|
| 
|-
| Kita e
| 
|
| 
|-
| Desert Punk
| 
|
| 
|-
| Tsukuyomi -Moon Phase-
| Kohei Morioka
|
| 
|-
| Hamtaro
|
| Ep. 182
|
|-
| Phoenix
| 
|
| 
|-
| Bobobo-bo Bo-bobo
| Yashinomi Man
|
| 
|-
| Monkey Turn
| 
| 
|
|-
| Ring ni Kakero
| Takeshi Kawai
|
| 
|-
| Rockman.EXE Stream
| Narcy Hide
| 
|
|-
| Burn-Up Scramble
| Wonderful person
|
| 
|-
| Diamond Daydreams
| Minoru Jinguuji
|
| 
|-
| Samurai Gun
| Hebizo
|
| 
|-
| rowspan="6" | 2005
| The Law of Ueki
| Mario
|
| 
|-
| Gunparade March
| Nakatoshi Iwasaki
|
| 
|-
| Canvas 2: Niji Iro no Sketch
| 
| 
|
|-
| Cluster Edge
| Rhodo Chrosite
| 
|
|-
| Damekko Dōbutsu
| Peganosuke
| 
|
|-
| Tsubasa: Reservoir Chronicle
| Kiefer
| Ep. 16
|
|-
| 2005–06
| Honey and Clover
| Yūta Takemoto
| 
|
|-
| rowspan="2" | 2005
| Pani Poni Dash!
| Tsurugi Inugami, Lord Cat
| 
|
|-
| Battle B-Daman
| 
| 
|
|-
| 2005–06
| Play Ball
| Aiki
| 
|
|-
| 2005
| Iriya no Sora, UFO no Natsu
| Kunihiro Suizenji
| 
|
|-
| rowspan="2" | 2006
| Ergo Proxy
| Security Bureau employee
| Ep. 2
| 
|-
| Gakuen Heaven
| Kaoru Saionji
|
| 
|-
| 2006–09
| Sgt. Frog
| 
|
| 
|-
| rowspan="5" | 2006
| Zegapain
| Hayase
|
| 
|-
| Crash B-Daman
| Teruma Kamioka
|
| 
|-
| Fate/stay night
| Shinji Matō
| 
|
|-
| Princess Princess
| Shūya Arisada
| 
|
|-
| Rockman.EXE Beast
| Narcy Hide
| 
|
|-
| 2006–07
| The Galaxy Railways: Crossroads to Eternity
| Klaus Von Meinster
| 
|
|-
| rowspan="2" | 2006
| Ring ni Kakero 1: Nichibei Keisen Hen
| Takeshi Kawai
| 
|
|-
| Fist of the Blue Sky
| Peter
| 
|
|-
| rowspan="3" | 2007
| El Cazador de la Bruja
| Okama A
| 
|
|-
| Kishin Taisen Gigantic Formula
| Masahito Oghuro
| 
|
|-
| Sakura Taisen: New York NY.
| Tutankamon
|
|
|-
| 2007–08
| Mobile Suit Gundam 00
| Tieria Erde
| 
|
|-
| 2007
| Gintama
| Robot 502
| 
|
|-
| 2007–08
| Code-E
| Adol Brinberg
| second season titled Misson-E
|
|-
| 2007–09
| Sayonara Zetsubō Sensei
| Nozomu Itoshiki, Mikoto Itoshiki, Kouji Kumeta
| 
|
|-
| rowspan="8" | 2007
| Shion no Ō
| Kobayashi
| 
|
|-
| Shinkyoku Sōkai Polyphonica
| Phoron Tatara
| 
|
|-
| Digimon Data Squad
| Craniamon
| Ep. 39-48
|
|-
| Deltora Quest
| Sorcerer Oacus
| 
|
|-
| Nodame Cantabile
| Tomohito Kimura
| 
|
|-
| Hidamari Sketch
| Chokoyama
| 
|
|-
| Moonlight Mile 2nd Season -Touch Down-
| Mike
| 
|
|-
| Polyphonica
| Tatara Phoron
| 
|
|-
| rowspan="4" | 2008
| Macross Frontier
| Michael Blanc
| 
|
|-
| Monochrome Factor
| Kengo Asamura
| 
|
|-
| Hidamari Sketch × 365
| Chokoyama
| 
|
|-
| Mission-E
| Adol Brinberg
| 
|
|-
| 2008;17
| Natsume's Book of Friends series
| Takashi Natsume
| 6th season in 2017
|
|-
| rowspan="2" | 2008
| Hakushaku to Yōsei
| Paul Ferman
| 
| 
|-
| Tytania
| Louis Edmond Pages
| 
|
|-
|2009–present
|One Piece
|Trafalgar D. Water Law
|
|
|-
| rowspan="5" | 2009
| Polyphonica Crimson S
| Phoron Tatara
| 
|
|-
| Saint Seiya: The Lost Canvas
| Pisces Albafica
|
|
|-
| Bakemonogatari
| Koyomi Araragi
| 
|
|-
| Miracle Train: ōedo-sen e Yōkoso
| Riku Nakano
| 
|
|-
| Kobato
| Takashi Doumoto
| 
|
|-
| 2010–15
| Working!!
| Hiroomi Sōma
| 
|
|-
| rowspan="11" | 2010
| Angel Beats!
| Yuzuru Otonashi
| 
|
|-
|Durarara!!
|Izaya Orihara
|
| 
|-
| Arakawa Under the Bridge
| Kou Ichinomiya
| 
|
|-
| Uragiri wa Boku no Namae o Shitteiru
| Kuroto Hourai
| 
|
|-
| HeartCatch PreCure!
| Hideo Saitani
|
|
|-
| Togainu no Chi
| Yukihito
| 
|
|-
| Nura: Rise of the Yokai Clan
| Senba
| 
|
|-
| Arakawa Under the Bridge x Bridge
| Kou Ichinomiya
| 
|
|-
| The Animal Conference on the Environment
| Dr. Rabi the Rabbit
| 
|
|-
| Kacho No Koi
| Yukio Kumagai
| 
|
|-
| Ring ni Kakero 1: Shadow
| Takeshi kawai
| 
|
|-
| rowspan="12" | 2011
| Starry Sky
| Miyaji Ryunosuke
| 
|
|-
| Yondemasuyo, Azazel-san
| Beelzebub
| 
|
|-
| Blue Exorcist
| Mephisto Pheles
| 
|
|-
| Sekai-ichi Hatsukoi
| Yuu Yanase
|
|
|-
| Maji de Watashi ni Koi Shinasai!
| Yamato Naoe
| 
|
|-
| Dragon Crisis!
| Onyx
| 
|
|-
| Phi Brain: Puzzle of God
| Freecell
| 
|
|-
| Xi Avant
| Kaoru Takamura
| 
|
|-
| Gundam Age
| Zeheart Galette (adult)
| 
|
|-
| Carnival Phantasm
| Shinji Matou
| 
|
|-
| Fractale
| Colin
| 
|
|-
| Ring ni Kakero 1: Sekai Taikai-hen
| Takeshi kawai
| 
|
|-
| 2012
| Brave10
| Unno Rokurō
| 
|
|-
| 2012–15
| Kuroko's Basketball
| Seijūrō Akashi
|
|
|-
| rowspan="4" | 2012
| Ixion Saga DT
| Erecpyle Dukakis
| 
|
|-
| Mobile Suit Gundam AGE
| Zeheart Galette
| 
|
|-
| Nekomonogatari (Kuro)
| Koyomi Araragi
| 
|
|-
| Nisemonogatari
| Koyomi Araragi
| 
|
|-
| 2012–13
| Saint Seiya Omega
| Andromeda Shun
| 
|
|-
| 2012
| Shining Hearts: Shiawase no Pan
| Rick, Alvin
| 
|
|-
| 2012–13
| Shirokuma Café
| Penguin
| 
| 
|-
| rowspan="2" | 2012
| Medaka Box Abnormal
| Kei Munakata
| 
|
|-
| Busou Shinki
| Jindo
| 
|
|-
| rowspan="7" | 2013
| Hakkenden: Tōhō Hakken Ibun
| Riō Satomi
| 
|
|-
| Karneval
| Gareki
| 
|
|-
| Monogatari Series Second Season
| Koyomi Araragi
| 
|
|-
| Maoyu
| Young Merchant
| 
|
|-
| Senyu
| Teufel Diabolos
| 
|
|-
| Devil Survivor 2: The Animation
| Hibiki Kuze
| 
|
|-
| Brothers Conflict
| Juli
| 
|
|-
| 2013–present
| Attack on Titan
| Levi Ackerman
| 4th season in 2021
|
|-
| rowspan="7" | 2013
| Yondemasu yo, Azazel-san Z
| Beelzebub
| 
|
|-
| Otona Joshi No Anime Time (Jinsei Best 10)
| Kishida Yuusaka
| 
|
|-
| Makai Ōji: Devils and Realist
| Michael
| 
|
|-
| Galilei Donna
| Cicinho
| 
|
|-
| Phi Brain: Puzzle of God 3
| Freecell
| 
|
|-
| Lupin III: Princess of the breeze ~Kakusareta Kūchū Toshi~
| Shion
| 
|
|-
| Attack On Titan - Ilse's Notebook
| Levi Ackerman
| 
|
|-
| rowspan="17" | 2014
| Hamatora
| Art
|
|
|-
| Noragami
| Yato
|
|
|-
| Haikyū!!
| Ittetsu Takeda
|
|
|-
| Kamigami no Asobi
| Baldr Hringhorni
|
|
|-
| Captain Earth
| Arashi Teppei
|
|
|-
| Broken Blade
| Zess
|
|
|-
| Wooser's Hand-to-Mouth Life
| Darth Wooser
| 
|
|-
| Hero Bank
| Nagare Amano
|
|
|-
| Ace of Diamond
| Shunpei Sanada
| 
|
|-
| Fate/stay night: Unlimited Blade Works
| Shinji Matō
|
|
|-
| Re: Hamatora
| Art
| 
|
|-
| Space Dandy
| Johnny
| Ep. 20
| 
|-
| Sword Art Online II
| Zexceed/Shigemura Tamotsu
| 
|
|-
| Zephyr
| Kal
| 
|
|-
| Attack on Titan: No Regrets
| Levi Ackerman
|
|
|-
| The Seven Deadly Sins
| Helbram (Fairy form)
|
|
|-
| Tsukimonogatari
| Koyomi Araragi
|
|
|-
| rowspan="10" | 2015
| Durarara!!x2
| Izaya Orihara
| 
| 
|-
| Cute High Earth Defense Club Love!
| Kinshirō Kusatsu
| 
|
|-
| Ultimate Otaku Teacher
| Junichirō Kagami
| 
|
|-
| Saint Seiya: Soul of Gold
| Garmr Útgarðar
|
|
|-
| Prison School
| Kiyoshi Fujino
|
|
|-
| Noragami Aragoto
| Yato
| 
|
|-
| Owarimonogatari
| Koyomi Araragi, Seishirō Shishirui
| 
|
|-
| Mr. Osomatsu
| Choromatsu Matsuno
| 2nd and 3rd season in 2017 & 2020
|
|-
| Seiyu's Life!
| Hiroshi Kamiya (as himself)
| 
| 
|-
| Attack on Titan: Junior High
| Levi Ackerman
| 
| 
|-
| rowspan="6" | 2016
| Bungo Stray Dogs
| Edogawa Ranpo
| 2nd season in 2019
|  
|-
| Crayon Shin-chan
| Buriburizaemon
|
| 
|-
| The Disastrous Life of Saiki K.
| Kusuo Saiki
| 2nd season and Reawakened in 2018 & 2019
| 
|-
|My Hero Academia
|Kojiro Bondo
|2nd season onwards.
|
|-
| Servamp
| Tsurugi Kamiya
|
| 
|-
| The Great Passage
| Masashi Nishioka
|
|
|-
| rowspan="6" | 2017
| Blue Exorcist: Kyoto Impure King Arc
| Mephisto Pheles
|
|
|-
| ēlDLIVE
| Vega Victor
|
|
|-
|Convenience Store Boy Friends
| Asumi Natsu
|
|
|-
| Owarimonogatari 2nd Season
| Koyomi Araragi
| 
|
|-
|Children of the Whales
| Shuan
|
|
|-
| ROAD TO YOU: Kimi e to Tsuzuku Michi
| Ryouta
|
|
|-
| rowspan="8" | 2018
| Devils' Line
| Takeshi Makimura
|
|
|-
|The Seven Deadly Sins: Revival of the Commandments
| Helbram
|
|
|-
|Beatless
| Ginga Watarai
| Ep 7
|
|-
|The Legend of the Galactic Heroes: Die Neue These
| Andrew Falk
| Ep 10-11
|
|-
|Boarding School Juliet
| Scott Fold
|
|
|-
|Overlord III
|Kyouhukou
|
|
|-
|Inazuma Eleven: Ares
|Haizaki Ryouhei
|
|
|-
|Inazuma Eleven: Orion no Kokuin
|Haizaki Ryouhei
|
|
|-
| 2018–20
|Muhyo & Roji's Bureau of Supernatural Investigation
| Soratsugu Madoka
|
|
|-
| rowspan="4" | 2019
| Ace of Diamond Act II
| Shunpei Sanada
| 
|
|-
| Carole & Tuesday
| Tao
|
| 
|-
| African Office Worker
| Caracal
|
| 
|-
| GeGeGe no Kitarō
| Rei Isurugi
|
|
|-
| rowspan="2" | 2020
| Kakushigoto
| Kakushi Gotō
| 
|
|-
| The Gymnastics Samurai
| Ryū Ryūshō
| 
| 
|-
| rowspan="11" | 2021
| Skate-Leading Stars
| Reo Shinozaki
| 
|
|-
| Bungo Stray Dogs Wan!
| Edogawa Ranpo
|
|  
|-
| SSSS.Dynazenon
| Jyuga
| 
|
|-
| Backflip!!
| Kōtarō Watari
|
| 
|-
| Fruits Basket: The Final
| God
|
| 
|-
|  The Duke of Death and His Maid 
| Zain
| 
|
|-
| Life Lessons with Uramichi Oniisan
| Uramichi Omota
| 
|
|-
| Pokémon Journeys: The Series
| Tsurugi
|
| 
|-
| Bonobono
| Rosshi
| 
|
|-
|  Tesla Note 
| Oliver Thornton
| 
|
|-
| Sakugan
| DJK
|
|
|-
| rowspan="4" | 2022
| Kaginado Season 2
| Yuzuru Otonashi
|
|
|-
| The Yakuza's Guide to Babysitting
| Yuri Mashiro
|
|
|-
| Blue Lock
| Jinpachi Ego
|
|
|-
| Urusei Yatsura
| Ataru Moroboshi
|
|
|-
|2023
|MF Ghost
|Michael Beckenbauer
|
|
|}

Anime films

Live-action films

Tokusatsu

Video games
.hack//G.U. as Arena Commentator
Black Rock Shooter as LLWO (Ririo)
Black/Matrix AD (Advanced) as Abel
Black/Matrix 00
Black/Matrix 2 as Reiji
Brothers Conflict: Passion Pink as Juli
Castlevania: Lament of Innocence as Joachim Armster
Castlevania Judgment as Aeon
Dear My Sun!!
Dear Girl: Stories Hibiki - Hibiki Tokkun Daisakusen!
Dokidoki Pretty League
Dragon Quest Heroes II as Terry
Dragon Quest: Heroes as Terry
Dragon Quest Treasures as Admiral Mogsworth, Monsters
Drastic Killer
Fate/Extra as Shinji Matō
Fate/stay night Réalta Nua as Shinji Matō
Fate/tiger colosseum as Shinji Matō
Favorite Dear as Ryudrall Allgreen
Final Fantasy Type-0 as Machina Kunagiri
Final Fantasy Type-0 HD as Machina Kunagiri
Final Fantasy X as Gatta, other minor characters
Final Promise Story as Wolf
Fire Emblem Echoes: Shadows of Valentia as Clive
Gakuen Heaven Boy's Love Scramble! Type B
Gakuen Heaven Okawari!
Generation of Chaos Next
Genso Suikoden: Tsumugareshi Hyakunen no Toki as Protagonist
Granblue Fantasy as Levi (collaboration event)
Granblue Fantasy: Relink as Rolan
Green Green
Gum Kare! as Cool Ibuki
Gundam MS Sensen 0079
Gunparade March
Hoshi no Mahoroba
Hoshi Sora no Comic Garden
Identity V as Joseph Desaulniers
JoJo's Bizarre Adventure: All Star Battle as Rohan Kishibe
JoJo's Bizarre Adventure: Eyes of Heaven as Rohan Kishibe
Kamigami no Asobi: Ludere Deorum as Balder Hringhorni
Kanon
Kessen III as Azai Nagamasa
Klonoa
Kuroko's Basketball Game of Miracles as Akashi Seijūrō
Langrisser (IV and V) as McClaine
Last Ranker as Zig
Minna no Golf Portable
Macross Ace Frontier as Michael Blanc
Mobile Suit Gundam 00 as Tieria Erde
Mobile Suit Gundam 00: Gundam Meisters as Tieria Erde
Monochrome Factor Cross Road as Kengo Asamura
Moshimo Ashita ga Hare Naraba as Kazuki Hatoba
Onmyoji as Taishakuten
Operation Darkness
Panic Palette
Panic Palette Portable
Piyotan: Housekeeper wa Cute na Tantei
 Poison Pink as Orifen
 Pokémon as N (Black 2 White 2 Animated Trailer)
Real Rode
Saint Seiya Omega: Ultimate Cosmo as Andromeda Shun
Samurai Warriors as Azai Nagamasa
Sentimental Graffiti
Shin Megami Tensei IV as Jonathan and Kiyoharu
Shining Force EXA as Phillip
Shining Blade as Rick
Shining Hearts as Rick
Shining Wind as Shumari
Shining Hearts as Fried Karim
Shining Resonance Refrain as Jinas
Shirotsu Mesōwa: Episode of the Clovers
Starry Sky as Ryunosuke Miyaji
Steal! as Kiryu Takayuki
Street Gears as Rookie
Super Robot Taisen OG Saga: Masou Kishin II Revelation of Evil God as Eran Xenosakis
Super Robot Wars series as Tieria Erde, Mikhail "Michel" Blanc
Tales of Hearts as Chalcedony Arcome
Tales of Hearts R as Chalcedony Arcome
The Robot Tsukurōse!
Togainu no Chi as Yukihito
Tokyo Babel as Setsuna Tendō
Valkyrie Profile 2: Silmeria as Dallas, Kraad, Roland, Seluvia, Xehnon and Masato
Valkyria Chronicles II as Zeri
Venus & Braves
VitaminZ as Ruriya Tendo
Warriors Orochi as Azai Nagamasa
Xenosaga (I, II and III) as Canaan

Drama CD

Ai de Kitsuku Shibaritai ~Koi Yori Hageshiku~ as Ushio Igarashi
Attack On Titan Cleaning Battle as Levi
Barajou No Kiss as Mitsuru Tenjou
Hakushaku to Yōsei as Paul Ferman
Hana to Akuma as Vivi
I Love Pet! vol. 4 as Lop Ear - Sora
Karneval as Gareki
Kiss x Kiss vol 09: Tsundere Kiss as Togari Sakuya
Me & My Brothers as Takashi Miyashita
Mobile Suit Gundam 00 Another Story: Mission-2306 as Tieria Erde
Mobile Suit Gundam 00 Another Story: Road to 2307 as Tieria Erde
Mousou Kareshi (Pet) Series: Do M na Petto-kun as Makoto
Natsume Yūjin Chō as Takashi Natsume
S.L.H Stray Love Hearts! as Minemitsu Yamashina
Shin Megami Tensei: Devil Survivor as Naoya
Shirokuma Cafe as Penguin
Shitsuji-sama no Okiniiri as Iori Douke
Watashi ga Motete Dousunda as Hayato Shinomiya

Boys love CDs

 Abareru Inu as Yuuji Tanimoto
 Ai de Kitsuku Shibaritai: Koi Yori Hageshiku as Ushio Igarashi
 Ai Kamoshirenai: Yamada Yugi Bamboo Selection CD 2 as Yanagi
 Ai to Jingi ni Ikiru no sa as Seiji Shinkai
 Benriya-san as Aki Kirigaya
 blanc as Hikaru Kusakabe
 Doukyusei as Hikaru Kusakabe
 Eden wo Toukuhanarete 2 -Ryokuin no Rakuen- 
 Eden wo Toukuhanarete 3 -Setsunai Yoru no Rakuen-  as Tadanao Takahashi 
 Egoist no Junai as Yukihito Hanamoto
 Gakuen Heaven: Mirai wa Kimi no Mono as Kaoru Saionji
 Gakuen Heaven: Tsuyokina Ninensei as Kaoru Saionji
 Gakuen Heaven: Welcome to Heaven! as Kaoru Saionji
 Gakuen Heaven: Happy Paradise as Kaoru Saionji
 Hanaōgi: Zabuton 2 
 Hitorijime Theory as Wakamiya
  Isso mou, Kudokitai! as Mikuni 
  Kachou no Koi as Yukio Kumagai
 Kakehiki no Recipe as Masato Aihara
  Kamisama no Ude no Naka as Ginger 
  Kannou Shousetsuka wa Hatsujou-chuu♡   as Wakaba Miyano
  Kannou Shousetsuka wo Choukyou-chuu♡ as Wakaba Miyano
 Kawaii Hito as Tomohiro Ikeuchi
 Kayashima shi no Yuugana Seikatsu as Koizumi
 Kishidou Club as Yuuki Sawamura
 Kodomo no Hitomi (Misaki Kashiwabara)
 Koi dorobou o Sagase! as Mikari Kasugano
 Koi no Shizuku as Hajime Kikusui
 Koi ni Inochi o Kakeru no sa as Seiji Shinkai
 Kotonoha no Hana Series 1: Kotonoha no hana as Kazuaki Yomura
 Kotonoha no Hana Series 2: Kotonoha no sekai as Kazuyo Akimura (fortune-teller)
 Kotonoha no Hana Series 1.5: Kotonoha Biyori as Kazuaki Yomura
 Kowakare: Zabuton  3 
 Kuroi Ryuu wa Nido Chikau as Rashuri
 Migatte na Karyuudo as Satoshi Takase
 Milk Crown no Tameiki as Mitsuru Uchikawa
 Mimi o Sumaseba Kasukana Umi as Shoi Oosawa
 Missing Road: Sekai wo Koete Kimi o Yobu as Alandis
 N Dai Fuzoku Byōin Series 2 as Masahiko Sudo
 O.B. as Hikaru Kusakabe
  Osana na Jimi as Mitsuo Izawa
 Ouji-sama Lv 2
 Pretty Babies 1 & 2 as Kanata Fujino
 Rakuen no Uta 1 & 2 as Nachi Sasamoto
 Reload as Satoshi Jingu 
 Renai Kyotei Nukegake Nashi! as Igarashi Masami
 Renai Sousa 1 & 2 as Kousuke Shiki
 S as Masaki Shiiba
 S - Kamiato - as Masaki Shiiba
 S - Rekka - as Masaki Shiiba
 S - Zankou - as Masaki Shiiba
 Saihate no Kimi e as Masaya
 Sanbyaku nen no Koi no Hate as Kon
  Seikanji Series Vol. 1. Kono Tsumibukaki Yoru ni
  Seikanji Series Vol. 2. Yogoto Mitsu wa Shitatarite as Fuyuki Seikanji 
  Seikanji Series vol. 3. Setsunasa wa Yoru no Biyaku
  Seikanji Series Vol. 4. Tsumi no Shitone mo Nureru Yoru as Fuyuki Seikanji
  Seikanji Series Vol. 6. Owari Naki Yorunohate
 Sekai-ichi Hatsukoi 1: Onodera Ritsu no Baai + Yoshino Chiaki no Baai as Yuu Yanase
 Sekai-ichi Hatsukoi 2: Yoshino Chiaki no Baai + Onodera Ritsu no Baai as Yuu Yanase
 Sekai-ichi Hatsukoi 3: Onodera Ritsu no Baai + Yoshino Chiaki no Baai as Yuu Yanase
 Sekai-ichi Hatsukoi 4: Yoshino Chiaki no Baai + Onodera Ritsu no Baai as Yuu Yanase
 Sentimental Garden Lover as Hiro
 Sex Pistols 3 as Shima
  Shinayakana Netsujou Series 1. Shinayakana Netsujou as Omi Koyama
  Shinayakana Netsujou Series 1.5 Sarasara as Omi Koyama
  Shinayakana Netsujou Series 2. Himeya ka na Junjo as Omi Koyama
  Shinayakana Netsujou Series 3. Azayakana Renjo as Omi Koyama
  Shinayakana Netsujou Series 4. Yasuraka na Yoru no tame no Guwa as Omi Koyama
  Shinayakana Netsujou Series 5. Hanayakana Aijo as Omi Koyama
  Shinayakana Netsujou Series 6. Taoyakana Shinjo as Omi Koyama
  Shinayakana Netsujou Bangaihen - Papillon de Chocolat
 Shounen Yonkei
 Slavers Series 2: Slaver's Lover Zenpen as Yoshihiro Hayase
 Slavers Series 3: Slaver's Lover Kouhen as Yoshihiro Hayase
 Slavers Series 4: Freezing Eye as Yoshihiro Hayase
 Sokubaku no Aria as Shiki Fujimoto
 Sono Yubi Dake ga Shitte Iru 2: Hidarite wa Kare no Yume o Miru as Masanobu Asaka
 Sono Yubi Dake ga Shitte Iru 3: Kusuri Yubi wa Chinmoku Suru as Masanobu Asaka
 Sora to Hara as Hikaru Kusakabe
 Sotsugyousei  as Hikaru Kusakabe
 Steal! Series  as Takayuki Kiryuu
 Steal! Series 1: 1st Mission as Takayuki Kiryuu
 Steal! Series 2: 2nd Mission as Takayuki Kiryuu
 Steal! Series 3 part 1: Koisuru Valentine as Takayuki Kiryuu
 Steal! Series 3 part 2: Aisare White Day as Takayuki Kiryuu
 Subete wa Kono Yoru ni as Satoru Kaji
 Super Lovers as Kaidou Ren
 Tsumi no Shitone mo Nureru Yoru as Seikanji Fuyuki
 Unison as Shuiichi Nagase
 Utsukushii Hito as Riku Kotani
 VIP as Kazutaka Yugi
 VIP: Toge as Kazutaka Yugi
 VIP: Kowaku as Kazutaka Yugi
 Zabuton

Dubbing

Live-action
Josh Hutcherson
The Hunger Games – Peeta Mellark
The Hunger Games: Catching Fire – Peeta Mellark
The Hunger Games: Mockingjay – Part 1 – Peeta Mellark
The Hunger Games: Mockingjay – Part 2 – Peeta Mellark
2 Days in the Valley – Allan Hopper (Greg Cruttwell)
Aaron Stone – S.T.A.N. (J. P. Manoux)
Alita: Battle Angel – Zapan (Ed Skrein)
Batman v Superman: Dawn of Justice – Lex Luthor (Jesse Eisenberg)
Below the Surface – Philip Nørgaard (Johannes Lassen)
Detective Chinatown 3 – Qin Feng (Liu Haoran)
F4 Thailand: Boys Over Flowers – Kavin Taemiyaklin Kittiyangkul (Metawin Opas-iamkajorn)
F9 – Otto (Thue Ersted Rasmussen)
Flatliners – Ray (Diego Luna)
Genius – Young Pablo Picasso
It Chapter Two – Adult Eddie Kaspbrak (James Ransone)
Journey to the West: Conquering the Demons – Prince Important (Show Lo)
Justice League – Lex Luthor (Jesse Eisenberg)
Killing Eve – Aaron Peel (Henry Lloyd-Hughes)
Pee Mak – Aey
Running Wild with Bear Grylls – Bobby Bones
Shark Lake – Peter Mayes (Michael Aaron Milligan)
Zack Snyder's Justice League – Lex Luthor (Jesse Eisenberg)

Animation
Clifford the Big Red Dog – T-Bone

Character song CD

Attack on Titan - "Dark Side Of The Moon"
Bungo Stray Dogs - "Labyrinth Deciphering Game"
Cute High Earth Defense Club LOVE! - "Never Know"
Dear My Sun!! - "Metamorphose"
Digimon Frontier - "In the Blue"
Digimon Frontier - "More More Happy Christmas"
Durarara!! - "Subarashii Hibi (Wonderful Days)"
Durarara!! - "Katte ni Shiyagare (Whatever You Like)"
Favorite Dear - "Mirai no Tameni"
Gakuen Heaven - "Little Wish"
Gakuen Heaven - "Share the Future"
Gakuen Heaven - "Walk Up!"
Green Green - "Ondō ~Sōchō Solo Ver.~"
Hakushaku to Yōsei - "Shining Rose"
Kamigami no Asobi - "I Bless You"
Karneval - "Reach for the sky"
Kuroko's Basketball - FINAL EMPEROR
Kuroko's Basketball - DOUBLE CORE
Mobile Suit Gundam 00 - "Idea"
Mobile Suit Gundam 00 - "Elephant"
Monochrome Factor - "Awake ~Boku no Subete~"
Monochrome Factor - "The World of Tomorrow"
Natsume Yūjin Chō - "Atatakai Basho"
Noragami - "Tsukiyo no Fune"
Lxion Saga DT - "Stand Up ED"
One Piece - "Dr. Heart Stealer"
One Piece - "Lost in Shinsekai"
One Piece - "Headliners"
Pani Poni Dash! - "Nikukyū Bochō"
Ring ni Kakero - "Ibara no Senritsu ~Melody~"
Samurai Warriors - "Tokoshie Ni Saku Hana (A Flower That Blooms Eternally)"
Sayonara Zetsubō Sensei - "Happy Nanchara"
Sayonara Zetsubō Sensei - "Zesshō"
Sayonara Zetsubō Sensei - "Kurayami Shinjuu Soushisouai"
Shinkyoku Sōkai Polyphonica - "Way to Go"
Starry Sky - "Shoot High"
Ultra Maniac - "Boku dake no..."
Working!! - "Heart no Edge ni Idomō (Go to Heart Edge)"
Working!!2 - "Itsumo you ni Love & Peace"
"Working!!3" - "Matsuge ni Lock"
Zoku Natsume Yūjin Chō - "Ayumiyoru Yuuki"

Discography

Mini albums
  (2009)
  (2013)
  (2014)
  (2015)
  (2015)
  (2016)
 Toy Box (2018)
 Cue (2019)
 TP (2020)
 Brand New Way (2021)

Albums
  (2011)

Singles
 "For Myself" (2010)
  (2011)
 "Such a Beautiful Affair" (2012)
 "START AGAIN" (2014)
 "Danger Heaven?" (2016)
  (2017)
(2017)

Live performances
Kiramune Music Festival 2009
Kiramune Music Festival 2010
Kiramune Music Festival 2012
Kiramune Music Festival 2013
Kiramune Music Festival 2014
Kiramune Music Festival 2015
Hiroshi Kamiya ~First Live~
Kiramune Music Festival 2016
DGS EXPO 2016
 Hiroshi Kamiya Live 2016 “LIVE THEATER”
Kiramune Music Festival 2017
KAmiYU in Wonderland 4 2018
Kiramune Music Festival 2018
DGS vs MOB Live Survive 2018
Hiroshi Kamiya LIVE TOUR “SUNNY BOX” 2021

References

External links
  
 Hiroshi Kamiya at Ryu's Seiyuu Info 
 Hiroshi Kamiya  at GamePlaza-Haruka Voice Acting Database 
 Hiroshi Kamiya at Hitoshi Doi's Seiyuu Database
 
 

1975 births
Living people
Aoni Production voice actors
Best Actor Seiyu Award winners
Japanese male pop singers
Japanese male video game actors
Japanese male voice actors
Lantis (company) artists
Male voice actors from Chiba Prefecture
Musicians from Chiba Prefecture
Seiyu Award winners
20th-century Japanese male actors
21st-century Japanese male actors
21st-century Japanese singers
21st-century Japanese male singers
Masochistic Ono Band members